Éjeme is a village and municipality in the province of Salamanca, western Spain, part of the autonomous community of Castile–León.

Geography

See also
List of municipalities in Salamanca

References

Municipalities in the Province of Salamanca